William Hinde may refer to: 
William Hinde (priest) (1569–1629), English clergyman and writer
William Hinde (British Army officer) (1900–1981), British soldier and polo player